John Marini is an American political scientist. He is a Professor of Political Science at the University of Nevada, Reno, and a senior fellow at the Claremont Institute. He is the author of two books about the administrative state and the co-editor of two more books.

Early life
John Marini earned a PhD from the University of California, Davis.

Career
Marini taught Political Science at the University of Dallas and Ohio University. He is now a full professor at the University of Nevada, Reno. He is also a senior fellow at the Claremont Institute, a conservative think tank.

Marini is the editor of two books about the United States Congress, and the author of two more books about the American administrative state. In The Politics Of Budget Control: Congress, The Presidency And Growth Of The Administrative State, he argues that the growth of governmental bureaucracy is unlimited due to the absence of budgetary restraints, and that it is unconstitutional because it arrogates all powers. He adds that Congress is the main focus of the administrative state. In a review for the Journal of Political Analysis and Management, William A. Niskanen of the Cato Institute suggested it was "an elegant, profound, and disturbing book", but he regretted the lack of quantitative data or public choice theory in Marini's analysis. In Unmasking the Administrative State: The Crisis of American Politics in the Twenty-First Century, Marini writes about the growth of the administrative state at the expense of the Constitution over the course of the twentieth century, with the challenges it raises and the theoretical tools that could curtail it. For Marini, the administrative state is antithetical to America's populist tradition of self-government.

In an essay for the Claremont Review of Books published in July 2016 and entitled Donald Trump and the American Crisis, Marini suggested then-presidential candidate Donald Trump should be commended for his recognition that neither the Democratic Party nor the Republican Party represented the American people anymore.

Works

References

External links
John Marini on C-SPAN

Living people
University of California, Davis alumni
University of Dallas faculty
Ohio University faculty
University of Nevada, Reno faculty
American political scientists
Year of birth missing (living people)